Trondheim 2018 was a proposed bid for Trondheim, Norway, to host the 2018 Winter Olympics. Along with Oslo and Tromsø bid, it was one of three options for the Norwegian Olympic Committee, who ultimately chose to not bid for the games.

Plans

Most of the events would take place in Trondheim and its suburbs. Nordic skiing and biathlon would have taken place at Granåsen, which previously has hosted the FIS Nordic World Ski Championships 1997. Five competition ice rinks would be built: two at Leangen, for short-track speed skating and figure skating and ice hockey, Tiller for ice hockey, Stjørdal for curling, and Brattøra for speed skating. The latter would be built nearly a sea level, and would have spectators on one end and a glass wall on the other, giving a view of the Trondheimsfjord. Freestyle and snowboarding would be located at Vassfjellet. Alpine skiing and sliding sports would be located at Oppdal. With the exception of Brattøra, all venues would have been built in connection with existing venues.

The opening and closing ceremonies would have taken place at Lerkendal stadion, the home ground of Rosenborg BK. A media center was planned at Lerkendal, which would afterwards be converted to student housing. The Olympic Village would be located at Tempe and would afterwards be sold as housing. A separate Olympic Village would be built in Oppdal. Medal ceremonies would take place at Torvet in the city center of Trondheim, and Torget in Oppdal. For volunteers, 30,000 beds exist, and another 30,000 beds are available within two hours of Trondheim.

As long as existing plans for transport in the region were followed, only minor upgrades to Trondheim Airport, Værnes would be needed. The upgrades would allow the transport time along the  Trondheim and Oppdal in 75 minutes. Marvin Wiseth, who was managing director of the project group, stated that Trondheim's goal was to "give the Olympics back to the people". They estimated 2 million spectators at the events. In Norway, regional policy was an important factor in deciding where the applicant city should be; Wiseth stated that with was completely unimportant for IOC, and that Trondheim first and foremost focused on having the best bid in the world, rather than the best bid in Norway.

Evaluation and outcome
The Trondheim bid was one of three submitted to the Norwegian Olympic and Paralympic Committee and Confederation of Sports (NIF), along with Oslo and Tromsø. The three bids were evaluated by a committee led by Odd Martinsen, which concluded that Trondheim was the second-most suitable, behind Oslo, based on the same criteria that IOC uses to evaluate bids. The decision for a Norwegian applicant was taken by the NIF board on 30 March 2007. In the first round of voting, only Geir Kvillum voted for Trondheim. In the following round, both Oslo and Tromsø received six votes, and President Odd-Roar Thorsen received the decisive vote.

References

External links

2018 Winter Olympics bids
Sport in Trondheim